Alasin is the third single from the Ruoska album, Amortem.  In Finnish, "Alasin" means Anvil.  This single also features the music video for Mies yli laidan.

Track listings
 "Alasin"
 "Mies yli laidan" music video

References

External links
 Additional information (in Finnish)
 "Alasin" lyrics

Ruoska songs
2006 singles
2006 songs
EMI Records singles